"Same Old Star" is a song recorded by American country music group McBride & the Ride.  It was released in August 1991 as the fourth single from the album Burnin' Up the Road.  The song reached #28 on the Billboard Hot Country Singles & Tracks chart.  The song was written by Terry McBride, Bill Carter, Ruth Ellsworth and Gary Nicholson.

Chart performance

References

1991 singles
McBride & the Ride songs
Songs written by Terry McBride (musician)
Songs written by Gary Nicholson
Song recordings produced by Tony Brown (record producer)
MCA Records singles
1991 songs